"More Life in a Tramps Vest" is the second single released by Welsh rock band Stereophonics. The song is taken from the band's debut album, Word Gets Around (1997), and was released on 19 May 1997. It reached number 33 on the UK Singles Chart. The song is about life from the view of someone working on a market stall. The single's B-side, "Raymond's Shop", is featured on Stereophonics' greatest hits compilation album Decade in the Sun.

Music video
The video shows various activities (such as shopping, riding a bus, playing football), but everyone has televisions for heads, which show many different things. The only people who don't have televisions for head are the band, who are shown performing in nearby Aberdare Market, where lead singer Kelly worked selling fruit and vegetables before the band were signed. The band then perform on traffic islands with traffic signs to nearby villages of  Maerdy and Hirwaun.

Track listings
All music was composed by Kelly Jones, Richard Jones and Stuart Cable. All lyrics were written by Kelly Jones.

CD 1
 "More Life in a Tramps Vest" – 2:21
 "Raymond's Shop" – 2:52
 "Poppy Day" – 3:43

CD 2 - Live EP
 "More Life in a Tramps Vest"
 "Looks Like Chaplin"
 "Too Many Sandwiches"
 "Last of the Big Time Drinkers"
All tracks recorded Live at Oxford Zodiac

7-inch vinyl
 "More Life in a Tramps Vest" – 2:21
 "Raymond's Shop" – 2:52

Charts

Other versions
 A live version is included on CD2 of the "Traffic" single, it was recorded at the Belfort Festival.
 The live version of "Raymond's Shop" is on the Live at Cardiff Castle DVD and "The Bartender and the Thief" single.

References

1997 singles
Songs written by Kelly Jones
Stereophonics songs
V2 Records singles